This is the results breakdown of the local elections held in Andalusia on 26 May 2019. The following tables show detailed results in the autonomous community's most populous municipalities, sorted alphabetically.

Opinion polls

Overall

City control
The following table lists party control in the most populous municipalities, including provincial capitals (shown in bold). Gains for a party are displayed with the cell's background shaded in that party's colour.

Municipalities

Alcalá de Guadaíra
Population: 75,256

Algeciras
Population: 121,414

Almería
Population: 196,851

Antequera
Population: 41,154

Benalmádena
Population: 67,746

Cádiz
Population: 116,979

Chiclana de la Frontera
Population: 83,831

Córdoba
Population: 325,708

Dos Hermanas
Population: 133,168

Écija
Population: 39,882

El Ejido
Population: 84,710

El Puerto de Santa María
Population: 88,364

Estepona
Population: 67,012

Fuengirola
Population: 75,396

Granada
Population: 232,208

Huelva
Population: 144,258

Jaén
Population: 113,457

Jerez de la Frontera
Population: 212,879

La Línea de la Concepción
Population: 62,940

Linares
Population: 57,811

Málaga
Population: 571,026

Marbella
Population: 141,463

Mijas
Population: 80,630

Morón de la Frontera
Population: 27,844

Motril
Population: 58,078

Ronda
Population: 33,978

Roquetas de Mar
Population: 94,925

San Fernando
Population: 95,174

Sanlúcar de Barrameda
Population: 68,037

Seville

Population: 688,711

Torremolinos
Population: 68,262

Utrera
Population: 50,250

Vélez-Málaga
Population: 80,817

References

Andalusia
2019